Divan Rossouw (born 12 March 1996) is a Namibian rugby union player, currently playing in South Africa for the  in Super Rugby, the  in the Currie Cup and the  in the Rugby Challenge. He is a utility back that can play as a fullback, winger, centre or scrum-half.

Rugby career

2009–2014: Youth rugby / Namibia

Rossouw was born and grew up in Windhoek. He was selected to represent Namibia as early as primary school level, playing at the South African Under-13 Craven Week tournament held in Kimberley in 2009, starting in the scrum-half position and helping them to one victory in their match against Zimbabwe.

In 2012, he appeared for Namibia at the Under-16 Grant Khomo Week held in Johannesburg. He played all their matches at outside centre and he contributed 15 points in their 30–13 victory over Zimbabwe, scoring one try, two conversions and two penalties to finish as his side's top scorer in the tournament.

He again represented Namibia in 2014 in South Africa's premier rugby union competition for high schools, the Under-18 Craven Week tournament held in Middelburg. He scored two tries from the outside centre in their 69–0 victory over Border Country Districts in their second match, and a further two tries from fullback in their final match against Zimbabwe, finishing the tournament as Namibia's top try scorer, just one try behind the joint-top try scorers in the competition.

2015–present: Blue Bulls / Bulls

He made eleven starts for the  team during the 2015 Under-19 Provincial Championship, starting six matches on the left wing and five at fullback. He scored nine tries during the competition; after single tries in matches against Eastern Province, Free State (away), Leopards, Western Province and Free State (home), he scored two tries in their match against the Sharks. One more try followed during the regular season against Eastern Province as the Blue Bulls finished the season in second position on the log to qualify for a home semi-final. Rossouw's nine tries meant he was the third-highest try scorer in Group A of the competition behind the Leopards' Zweli Silaule and Rossouw's team-mate Franco Naudé. In addition to his eleven appearances in the Under-19 competition, Rossouw also made two appearances for the  team in 2015, scoring one try in their 55–33 victory over the Leopards.

He kicked a conversion in their 57–28 the following week, to score his first points of his senior career, as started that match at fullback. He made a total of ten appearances as he helped the Blue Bulls to seventh place on the log. In the second half of the season, Rossouw made five starts for the  team in the 2016 Under-21 Provincial Championship, scoring a try in their match against  as the Blue Bulls finished third before losing 15–37 to trans-Jukskei rivals the Golden Lions in the semi-finals.

In November 2016, he was named in the  Super Rugby team's extended training squad during the team's preparations for the 2017 Super Rugby season.

References

1996 births
Living people
Blue Bulls players
Bulls (rugby union) players
Golden Lions players
Lions (United Rugby Championship) players
Namibian rugby union players
Rugby union centres
Rugby union fullbacks
Rugby union players from Windhoek
Rugby union scrum-halves
Rugby union wings
Namibia international rugby union players